The Mabery Gelvin Botanical Garden (8 acres) is a botanical garden located within the Lake of the Woods Forest Preserve.  Its address is just off State Route 47, one mile (1.6 km) north of Interstate 74, in Mahomet, Illinois. It is open during daylight hours; admission is free.  The garden includes waterfalls and an All-America Selections Display Garden featuring bedding plants and vegetables.

Wedding rentals 
Wedding rentals are permitted at this facility.

See also 
 List of botanical gardens in the United States

References 

Botanical gardens in Illinois
Protected areas of Champaign County, Illinois